Moths of Oman represent about 190 known moth species. The moths (mostly nocturnal) and butterflies (mostly diurnal) together make up the taxonomic order Lepidoptera.

This is a list of moth species which have been recorded in Oman.

Arctiidae
Lepista arabica (Rebel, 1907)
Siccia dudai Ivinskis & Saldaitis, 2008
Teracotona murtafaa Wiltshire, 1980

Autostichidae
Turatia iranica Gozmány, 2000

Coleophoridae
Coleophora aegyptiacae Walsingham, 1907
Coleophora arachnias Meyrick, 1922
Coleophora aularia Meyrick, 1924
Coleophora eilatica Baldizzone, 1994
Coleophora jerusalemella Toll, 1942
Coleophora microalbella Amsel, 1935
Coleophora niphomesta Meyrick, 1917
Coleophora omanica Baldizzone, 2007
Coleophora sogdianae Baldizzone, 1994
Coleophora teheranella Baldizzone, 1994
Coleophora versurella Zeller, 1849

Cossidae
Azygophleps larseni Yakovlev & Saldaitis, 2011
Meharia acuta Wiltshire, 1982
Meharia philbyi Bradley, 1952
Meharia semilactea (Warren et Rothschild, 1905)
Mormogystia proleuca (Hampson in Walsingham et Hampson, 1896)

Crambidae
Heliothela ophideresana (Walker, 1863)

Geometridae
Brachyglossina sciasmatica Brandt, 1941
Cleora nana Hausmann & Skou, 2008
Eupithecia mekrana Brandt, 1941
Eupithecia ultimaria Boisduval, 1840
Hemithea punctifimbria Warren, 1896
Idaea eremica (Brandt, 1941)
Idaea gallagheri Wiltshire, 1983
Idaea granulosa (Warren & Rothschild, 1905)
Idaea illustris (Brandt, 1941)
Palaeaspilates sublutearia (Wiltshire, 1977)
Pasiphila palaearctica (Brandt, 1938)
Scopula caesaria (Walker, 1861)
Traminda mundissima (Walker, 1861)
Xanthorhoe rhodoides (Brandt, 1941)
Xanthorhoe wiltshirei (Brandt, 1941)

Gracillariidae
Phyllonorycter jabalshamsi de Prins, 2012

Lasiocampidae
Sena augustasi Zolotuhin, Saldaitis & Ivinskis, 2009

Limacodidae
Deltoptera omana Wiltshire, 1976

Metarbelidae
Salagena guichardi Wiltshire, 1980

Micronoctuidae
Micronola wadicola Amsel, 1935

Nepticulidae
Stigmella birgittae Gustafsson, 1985

Noctuidae
Acantholipes circumdata (Walker, 1858)
Achaea catella Guenée, 1852
Acontia akbar Wiltshire, 1985
Acontia asbenensis (Rothschild, 1921)
Acontia basifera Walker, 1857
Acontia binominata (Butler, 1892)
Acontia imitatrix Wallengren, 1856
Acontia minuscula Hacker, Legrain & Fibiger, 2010
Acontia peksi Hacker, Legrain & Fibiger, 2008
Acontia philbyi Wiltshire, 1988
Acontia porphyrea (Butler, 1898)
Acontia saldaitis Hacker, Legrain & Fibiger, 2010
Acontia solitaria Hacker, Legrain & Fibiger, 2008
Acontia tabberti Hacker, Legrain & Fibiger, 2010
Adisura callima Bethune-Baker, 1911
Aegocera brevivitta Hampson, 1901
Agrotis biconica Kollar, 1844
Agrotis ipsilon (Hufnagel, 1766)
Amyna axis Guenée, 1852
Amyna punctum (Fabricius, 1794)
Anarta trifolii (Hufnagel, 1766)
Androlymnia clavata Hampson, 1910
Anoba triangularis (Warnecke, 1938)
Anomis flava (Fabricius, 1775)
Anomis sabulifera (Guenée, 1852)
Antarchaea conicephala (Staudinger, 1870)
Antarchaea erubescens (Bang-Haas, 1910)
Antarchaea fragilis (Butler, 1875)
Anumeta spilota (Erschoff, 1874)
Argyrogramma signata (Fabricius, 1775)
Armada gallagheri Wiltshire, 1985
Athetis pigra (Guenée, 1852)
Brevipecten hypocornuta Hacker & Fibiger, 2007
Callopistria latreillei (Duponchel, 1827)
Caradrina eremicola (Plante, 1997)
Caradrina soudanensis (Hampson, 1918)
Caranilla uvarovi (Wiltshire, 1949)
Chrysodeixis acuta (Walker, [1858])
Chrysodeixis chalcites (Esper, 1789)
Clytie infrequens (Swinhoe, 1884)
Clytie tropicalis Rungs, 1975
Condica capensis (Guenée, 1852)
Condica illecta Walker, 1865
Condica viscosa (Freyer, 1831)
Ctenoplusia fracta (Walker, 1857)
Ctenoplusia limbirena (Guenée, 1852)
Drasteria kabylaria (Bang-Haas, 1906)
Dysgonia angularis (Boisduval, 1833)
Dysgonia torrida (Guenée, 1852)
Eublemma anachoresis (Wallengren, 1863)
Eublemma apicipunctalis (Brandt, 1939)
Eublemma khonoides Wiltshire, 1980
Eublemma odontophora Hampson, 1910
Eublemma parva (Hübner, [1808])
Eublemma roseana (Moore, 1881)
Eublemma seminivea Hampson, 1896
Eublemma siticuosa (Lederer, 1858)
Eulocastra alfierii Wiltshire, 1948
Eutelia adulatrix (Hübner, 1813)
Feliniopsis consummata (Walker, 1857)
Feliniopsis talhouki (Wiltshire, 1983)
Gnamptonyx innexa (Walker, 1858)
Hadjina tyriobaphes Wiltshire, 1983
Haplocestra similis Aurivillius, 1910
Helicoverpa armigera (Hübner, [1808])
Heliocheilus confertissima (Walker, 1865)
Heliothis nubigera Herrich-Schäffer, 1851
Heliothis peltigera ([Denis & Schiffermüller], 1775)
Heteropalpia acrosticta (Püngeler, 1904)
Heteropalpia exarata (Mabille, 1890)
Heteropalpia robusta Wiltshire, 1988
Heteropalpia vetusta (Walker, 1865)
Hypena abyssinialis Guenée, 1854
Hypena laceratalis Walker, 1859
Hypena lividalis (Hübner, 1790)
Hypena obacerralis Walker, [1859]
Hypena obsitalis (Hübner, [1813])
Hypotacha isthmigera Wiltshire, 1968
Hypotacha ochribasalis (Hampson, 1896)
Hypotacha raffaldii Berio, 1939
Iambiodes postpallida Wiltshire, 1977
Leucania loreyi (Duponchel, 1827)
Lophoptera arabica Hacker & Fibiger, 2006
Lyncestoides unilinea (Swinhoe, 1885)
Marathyssa cuneata (Saalmüller, 1891)
Masalia galatheae (Wallengren, 1856)
Metopoceras kneuckeri (Rebel, 1903)
Mimasura dhofarica Wiltshire, 1985
Mimasura larseni Wiltshire, 1985
Mocis proverai Zilli, 2000
Nagia natalensis (Hampson, 1902)
Nimasia brachyura Wiltshire, 1982
Oedicodia jarsisi Wiltshire, 1985
Ophiusa dianaris (Guenée, 1852)
Ophiusa mejanesi (Guenée, 1852)
Oraesia emarginata (Fabricius, 1794)
Oraesia intrusa (Krüger, 1939)
Ozarba adducta Berio, 1940
Ozarba atrifera Hampson, 1910
Ozarba mesozonata Hampson, 1916
Ozarba nyanza (Felder & Rogenhofer, 1874)
Ozarba phlebitis Hampson, 1910
Ozarba socotrana Hampson, 1910
Pandesma robusta (Walker, 1858)
Pericyma mendax (Walker, 1858)
Pericyma metaleuca Hampson, 1913
Polydesma umbricola Boisduval, 1833
Polytela cliens (Felder & Rogenhofer, 1874)
Prionofrontia ochrosia Hampson, 1926
Pseudozarba mesozona (Hampson, 1896)
Rhynchina albiscripta Hampson, 1916
Rhynchina coniodes Vári, 1962
Rhynchodontodes larseni Wiltshire, 1983
Sideridis chersotoides Wiltshire, 1956
Sphingomorpha chlorea (Cramer, 1777)
Spodoptera cilium Guenée, 1852
Spodoptera exigua (Hübner, 1808)
Spodoptera littoralis (Boisduval, 1833)
Spodoptera mauritia (Boisduval, 1833)
Stenosticta grisea Hampson, 1912
Stenosticta sibensis Wiltshire, 1977
Tathorhynchus exsiccata (Lederer, 1855)
Thiacidas postica Walker, 1855
Thysanoplusia exquisita (Felder & Rogenhofer, 1874)
Trichoplusia ni (Hübner, [1803])
Trichoplusia orichalcea (Fabricius, 1775)
Tytroca balnearia (Distant, 1898)
Ulotrichopus stertzi (Püngeler, 1907)
Ulotrichopus tinctipennis (Hampson, 1902)
Vittaplusia vittata (Wallengren, 1856)
Zethesides bettoni (Butler, 1898)

Nolidae
Bryophilopsis tarachoides Mabille, 1900
Churia gallagheri Wiltshire, 1985
Earias insulana (Boisduval, 1833)
Giaura dakkaki Wiltshire, 1986
Neaxestis aviuncis Wiltshire, 1985
Xanthodes albago (Fabricius, 1794)

Pterophoridae
Agdistis arabica Amsel, 1958
Agdistis nanodes Meyrick, 1906
Agdistis olei Arenberger, 1976
Agdistis omani Arenberger, 2008
Arcoptilia gizan Arenberger, 1985
Deuterocopus socotranus Rebel, 1907
Diacrotricha lanceatus (Arenberger, 1986)
Megalorhipida leptomeres (Meyrick, 1886)
Megalorhipida leucodactylus (Fabricius, 1794)
Pterophorus ischnodactyla (Treitschke, 1833)

Tischeriidae
Tischeria omani Puplesis & Diškus, 2003

Tortricidae
Age onychistica Diakonoff, 1982
Ancylis sederana Chrétien, 1915
Bactra venosana (Zeller, 1847)
Dasodis cladographa Diakonoff, 1983
Fulcrifera refrigescens (Meyrick, 1924)

Xyloryctidae
Eretmocera impactella (Walker, 1864)
Scythris alhamrae Bengtsson, 2002
Scythris amplexella Bengtsson, 2002
Scythris cucullella Bengtsson, 2002
Scythris elachistoides Bengtsson, 2002
Scythris fissurella Bengtsson, 1997
Scythris kebirella Amsel, 1935
Scythris nipholecta Meyrick, 1924
Scythris pangalactis Meyrick, 1933
Scythris pollicella Bengtsson, 2002
Scythris valgella Bengtsson, 2002

External links
AfroMoths

Lists of moths by country
Lists of moths of Asia
Moths

Moths